Plum Creek is a stream in Kossuth and Hancock counties, in the U.S. state of Hancock County, Iowa. It is a tributary of the east fork of the Des Moines River.

Plum Creek was named for the wild plum trees lining its banks.

See also
List of rivers of Iowa

References

Rivers of Hancock County, Iowa
Rivers of Kossuth County, Iowa
Rivers of Iowa